iCIMS, Inc. is a cloud-based human resources and recruiting software company. The company name is an acronym that stands for Internet Collaborative Information Management Systems. 

The company has offices in the former Bell Labs Holmdel Complex.

References

External links
 Corporate website
 United Kingdom corporate website

1999 establishments in New Jersey
Software companies established in 1999
Software companies based in New Jersey
E-recruitment
Software companies of the United States